The 2017 World Surf League Championship Tour (CT) is a professional competitive surfing league run by the World Surf League. Men and women compete in separate tours with events taking place from late February to mid-December, at various surfing locations around the world.

Surfers receive points for their best events. The surfer with the most points at the end of the tour (after discarding their two worst results) is announced the 2017 World Surf League Champion.

2017 Championship Tour

Event Results

2017 Men's Championship Tour Jeep Leaderboard 

Points are awarded using the following structure:

 Championship Tour surfers best 9 of 11 results are combined to equal their final point total
 Two Worst event results are omitted from the final point total
Legend

Source

Women's Championship Tour Jeep Leaderboard 

Points are awarded using the following structure:

 

 Championship Tour surfers best 8 of 10 results are combined to equal their final point total.
 Tournament results discarded

Legend

Source

Qualifying Series

Men's Qualifying Series 

Legend

Source

Women's Qualifying Series 

Legend

Source

References

External links

 
World Surf League
World League